The Family is a 2017 Venezuelan drama film directed by Gustavo Rondón Córdova. It was screened in the International Critics' Week section at the 2017 Cannes Film Festival. It was selected as the Venezuelan entry for the Best Foreign Language Film at the 91st Academy Awards, but it was not nominated.

Plot
Near Caracas, a father and his teenage son go on the run after a violent altercation puts their lives at risk.

Cast
 Giovanni García
 Reggie Reyes

Reception
, the film holds a 91% approval rating on review aggregator Rotten Tomatoes, based on eleven reviews with an average rating of 7.75/10.

See also
 List of submissions to the 91st Academy Awards for Best Foreign Language Film
 List of Venezuelan submissions for the Academy Award for Best Foreign Language Film

References

External links
 
 La Familia at Cine Mestizo

2017 films
2017 drama films
Venezuelan drama films
2010s Spanish-language films
2017 directorial debut films